Edwin Jacobus Gerardus Maria Linssen (born 28 August 1980) is a Dutch former professional footballer who played as a midfielder.

Career
Born in Neeritter, Linssen played for VVV-Venlo, Helmond Sport, Roda JC, Fortuna Sittard and AEK Larnaca, before signing with De Graafschap.

Personal life
He is the older brother of fellow professional footballer Bryan Linssen.

References

External links
 

1980 births
Living people
Dutch footballers
Dutch expatriate footballers
Eredivisie players
Eerste Divisie players
Cypriot First Division players
VVV-Venlo players
Helmond Sport players
Roda JC Kerkrade players
Fortuna Sittard players
AEK Larnaca FC players
De Graafschap players
People from Leudal
Expatriate footballers in Cyprus
Association football midfielders
Footballers from Limburg (Netherlands)
Dutch expatriate sportspeople in Cyprus